Friend of the World is a 2020 American independent black-and-white film written and directed by Brian Patrick Butler in his feature film debut, starring Nick Young and Alexandra Slade. The surreal experimental film takes place post-apocalypse and tells the story of a young filmmaker and a military general trapped in a bunker with a mysterious threat. The film has been categorized as a psychedelic film, a surrealist film, and an end of the world film.

Written as a dark comedy body horror film in 2016, the film was produced by Charybdis Pictures. Filming took place at Gray Area Multimedia in San Diego in May, 2017.

Friend of the World premiered August 15, 2020 at the Oceanside International Film Festival and was released on Apple TV, iTunes, Amazon Prime Video and Tubi by 2023. It was distributed by Troma Entertainment.

The film is critically acclaimed with  approval rating from  reviews on Rotten Tomatoes and ranks in the top 15 of Video Librarian's best narrative films of 2022.

Plot

In the aftermath of a global disaster, a young filmmaker (Diane) is trapped in a military bunker. She encounters an insane general (Gore) who seems to be her only hope of surviving the apocalypse.

Cast
 Nick Young as Gore
 Alexandra Slade as Diane
 Michael C. Burgess as Berenger
 Kathryn Schott as Eva
 Kevin Smith as Thin Man
 Luke Anthony Pensabene as Ferguson

Production

Development 
The script was formulated in 2016. Butler said the film is "about solitude, growth, and the corruption accompanying that growth within the enlightened, sometimes fractured psyches of our mentors."

Pre-production 
Pre-production started around August 2016. Diane was originally written as a young man, but scheduling conflicts and delays led to rewrites and ultimately Alexandra Slade was cast in the role. Kerry Rossall contributed to the production by funding the project directly.

Filming 
Principal photography began on May 13, 2017, in San Diego County and lasted for ten days. The majority of filming took place at Gray Area Multimedia, a key location Butler had intended to use for the production. Outside scenes were at Sunset Cliffs and the Tierrasanta entrance bridge to Mission Trails Regional Park near Camp Elliott. The cinematography was handled by Ray Gallardo and the special make-up effects by C.J. Martinez.

Post-production 
Butler had a rough cut of the film ready within months of wrapping but the final stages were not complete until 2019. Daniel N. Butler managed the visual effects and sound departments. In an interview with Voyage LA, upon completing the film, Butler stated:

Music 

Corin Totin of Sick Flix mentioned the film has "a background score of an almost unrecognizably discordant version of Ode to Joy." Celia Payne of Let's Talk Terror said "a surprisingly gleeful string arrangement accompanies scenes where humans-turned-monstrosities melt into themselves, shape-shift, and eat rats, bringing the audience into their world of insanity."

Themes

Style 
Melissa Hannon at Horror Geek Life said "although it technically falls within the post-apocalyptic category, Friend of the World defies any specific genre." Mark Harris at Black Horror Movies mentioned it mixes horror and sci-fi with heady drama. Several critics pointed out that it is a body horror film. Others conclude that it is a strange avant-garde art film filled with subtext. Lisa Marie Bowman at Through the Shattered Lens said it comes with "a hint of Kubrickian satire" with scenes reminiscent of Alien, concluding that surviving the end of the world does not mean you'll have a choice on who remains with you. Joseph Perry at Horror Fuel mentioned it's like The Twilight Zone if Rod Serling and Charles Beaumont ate psychedelic material, or if ideas from Dr. Strangelove, Night of the Living Dead and Apocalypse Now were merged. Albert Valentin of World Film Geek claims it is a zombie apocalypse film in the realm of "Romero meets Muschietti meets Cronenberg." Redmond Bacon at Tilt Magazine said it blends the zombie film genre with the existential film drama, acknowledging Butler, as if he had a "Raging Bull-like" David Lynch version of 10 Cloverfield Lane. Sean Parker of Horror Obsessive mentioned it has similarities to The Divine Comedy, with political satire and doomsday conspiracies.

Butler chose to have the film mostly in black-and-white to accentuate the perspective of Gore's world. Alain Elliott at Nerdly said shooting in black and white helped its style and low-budget film constraints. Milana Vujkov at Lola on Film claims it has "a terrifyingly delightful string of corruptive catalysts, explosive apparitions of post-humanity, taken straight out of Burroughs" and that the "unsustainability of the human condition in a genetically modified apocalypse is a mix of home movie and Brechtian theatre play." Dennis Schwartz Movie Reviews said that the fifty minute film is split up into chapters which allows for viewers to ponder at the nonlinear narrative. Jeremie Sabourin at Cinema Smack mentions that some filmmakers will extend a narrative out to ninety minutes even if they don’t have enough story to tell. "With Friend of the World though, it sometimes feels like there’s ninety minutes of content compacted into its fifty minute runtime." Celia Payne at Let's Talk Terror appreciated its shorter runtime, stating that "it shows the filmmakers know when their story is done and don’t try to extend when not necessary." Butler claims he structured the film to be around fifty minutes, like an episode of Twilight Zone or Black Mirror. Butler said:

Connection to reality 

Karla Peterson at The San Diego Union Tribune said that Butler did not anticipate his feature-film debut to happen virtually during an actual pandemic, although "the surreal environment is a perfect match for an unsettling film where the source of chaos might just be a contagion." Being made available around a global conflict, during a pandemic and controversial election year, it was received by critics as a prophetic experience.

Character analysis 
Jeremie Sabourin at Cinema Smack claims "Friend of the World also feels like a natural continuation of our current world due to its characters." Rebecca Cherry at Film Carnage said it makes a good attempt to identify "a more character driven apocalyptic story pulling elements from a modern America." Jim Morazzini of Voices From The Balcony claimed the characters as being "archetypes at opposite ends of American society" and compared the uncertain reality of the film to "An Occurrence at Owl Creek Bridge like flight of a mind approaching death." Brian Robertson of The Vista Press said "its characters echo a disturbing truth that is currently plaguing our nation today." Conor McShane at Morbidly Beautiful said it’s a film that brings up the ideological and racial divides in America.

Protagonist 
Diane is a young black woman, who's an artist and millennial filmmaker. She is a grounded, level-headed individual with liberal views. Joel Fisher of Battle Royale With Cheese points out that Diane being a filmmaker is Butler allowing the audience to "smile a little at the director mocking himself."

Antagonist 
General Gore is an old, heavily built military officer who seems increasingly unhinged. S Dewhirst of Set The Tape said he is "wild-eyed and larger than life, a big man with a big voice, big gut and big ideals." Critics have compared him to Sterling Hayden's Jack D. Ripper of Dr. Strangelove, Powers Boothe's Senator Ethan Roark of Sin City, Jack Nicholson's Jack Torrance of The Shining, and his voice to Anthony Hopkins and Gerald Mohr.

Influence 
In an interview with Times of San Diego, Butler stated that Friend of the World'''s style was inspired by the works of Samuel Beckett, Jean-Paul Sartre, John Carpenter and David Cronenberg. He mentioned that political anxieties and absurdist theatre helped inspire him to write. The film is said to draw inspiration from films and television such as The Twilight Zone, Dr. Strangelove, The Thing and La Jetée, as well as plays such as No Exit and Krapp's Last Tape. It is a two-hander film with "comic absurdity and social satire" that broadens the "body horror subgenre of science fiction and horror."

 Bible verse 

When asked if the film's title had any biblical influence, Butler confirmed it did not.

Release
The film was to premiere in early 2020, but the COVID-19 pandemic delayed its release. Friend of the World held a seven day virtual world premiere at the Oceanside International Film Festival on August 15, 2020. In December 2020, a second virtual screening was held at Another Hole in the Head Film Festival. In 2021, it was released on Plex and Amazon Prime Video and screened at San Diego Film Week. In 2022, it released on Tubi and Xumo and was distributed by Troma Entertainment on their streaming app Troma Now. By 2023, the film was released to an international audience on Apple TV and iTunes.

Reception
 Critical response Friend of the World received mostly positive reviews from critics. It has  approval rating on film review aggregator Rotten Tomatoes with an average score of  based on  reviews.

Jim Morazzini of Voices From The Balcony gave it a score of 3.5 out of 5 and said "it’s a strangely surreal piece, with a nonlinear plot accentuated with bizarre visuals and dialogue." Rob Rector of Film Threat scored the film 6 out of 10 and said it "works more like a stage play than a film [...] but it does share a persistent dread and discomfort" comparing it to Possum by Matthew Holness. Melissa Hannon at Horror Geek Life awarded the film 3.7 out of 5 stars, writing "Friend of the World is truly an acid trip of a movie." Jeremie Sabourin at Cinema Smack gave it 3.5 out of 5 and felt the tone matched Night of the Living Dead as if done by Terry Gilliam claiming that "its nightmarish and claustrophobic setting will have viewers on edge." Corin Totin of Sick Flix rated the film 4.5 out of 5, comparing it to Tetsuo: The Iron Man, declaring "this is a piece of art that is very much of this moment and really taps into the surreal horror that we are experiencing in the world at large right now."

Film critic Daniel M. Kimmel of the Boston Online Film Critics Association said "It makes for a disturbing 50-minute running time that is engaging but will likely leave you wondering what it was all about." Cheryl Eddy at Io9 says "there are flickers of humor along the way, as well as a slight story twist that explains the film’s title." Tim Brennan of About Boulder admitted arthouse films can be intimidating to watch, but called it a "strange little art film made with intelligence and wit." Alain Elliott of Nerdly said the dialogue driven performances are good and that "When you think post-apocalyptic zombie movie, this movie and its script isn’t what you expect." Lisa Marie Bowman of Through the Shattered Lens claims that "Butler emphasizes the claustrophobic conditions of the bunker, a version of Hell from which there really is no exit." Hugues Porquier from Battle Royale With Cheese called it "interesting writing" and "clean photography." They mentioned a possible reference to Leos Carax's Boy Meets Girl and said it reminded them of Videodrome and Existenz, swinging "between realism and surrealism." Dennis Schwartz Movie Reviews "chose to accept it as a strange arty experimental film.[...] It’s not a film for everyone." Mark H. Harris of Black Horror Movies said "the articulate script is dialogue-heavy with a philosophical bent" and it "presents some thoughtful takes on identity, individualism and reconciling divergent worldviews." Dante Yurei of 10th Circle said "the story becomes increasingly bizarre, unfolding like an experimental film, where the director grants himself various licenses to create without worrying about realism." Ken Stone of Times of San Diego mentioned Steven Spielberg's success shooting his first feature film Duel in thirteen days, the same production schedule Butler had. Celia Payne of Let's Talk Terror said "this is a horror comedy with plenty of sci-fi elements and laughs to lighten the mood when we need it most." S Dewhirst of Set The Tape said it has "themes of genetic engineering, world war, propaganda, paranoia and zombies" and that "fans of the off-beat, the weird, and the not-quite-mainstream will likely find plenty to enjoy in this strange, starkly-shot trip through the bunkers and cellars of a ruined world."

Corey Bulloch of UK Film Review claims it has "world-building that leaves more confusion than intrigue" and "constant ambiguity that it’s hard for the audience to maintain invested interest." Rebecca Cherry at Film Carnage gave it 2 out of 5 and said "There’s the classic theme of survival as with any apocalypse film but the threat isn’t sufficient enough to add the right amount of tension or suspense to keep you gripped or invested in the characters’ fate." Lindsey Ungerman at Horror Buzz said it had "Tarantino vibes", was "attention-grabbing and engaging but loses steam quickly due to story ambiguity and spasmodic dialogue." They rated it 3 out of 10 concluding that the film was "definitely beautiful" but "too chaotic." Marie Asner of The Phantom Tollbooth scored it 1 out of 5 and came to the conclusion that it "would have made a better radio drama than a film."Friend of the World ranks on Bored Panda's 50 Best Horror Comedies That Will Have You Confused Whether To Laugh Or Scream list and is considered one of Video Librarian's top 15 Best Narrative Films of 2022''.

Accolades

Similar films

 Eraserhead (1977 film)
 The Fly (1986 film)
 They Live (1988 film)
 Society (1989 film)
 The Lighthouse (2019 film)
 Possessor (2020 film)
 Don't Look Up (2021 film)

See also

 Who Goes There? (1938 novella)
 Art horror
 Parasitism
 Plague
 Postmodernist film
 Science fiction comedy
 Social thriller
 Surreal cinema
 Survival film
 Virus

References

External links
 
 
 
 
 Trailer on YouTube

2020 black comedy films
2020 comedy horror films
2020 directorial debut films
2020 films
2020 independent films
2020 science fiction horror films
2020s English-language films
2020s satirical films
2020s science fiction comedy films
American avant-garde and experimental films
American black-and-white films
American black comedy films
American body horror films
American comedy horror films
American horror thriller films
American independent films
American nonlinear narrative films
American post-apocalyptic films
American political satire films
American science fiction comedy films
American science fiction horror films
American zombie films
Films about genetic engineering
Existentialist films
Films about consciousness transfer
Films about filmmaking
Films about infectious diseases
Films about nuclear war and weapons
Films about World War III
Films directed by Brian Patrick Butler
Films partially in color
Films set in San Diego
Films shot in San Diego
Psychedelic films
Surreal comedy films
Surrealist films
Absurdist fiction
Troma Entertainment films
Two-handers
Films about corruption in the United States
Films about conversations
Films set in bunkers
2020s American films
2020 horror thriller films
2020s avant-garde and experimental films
Films about conspiracy theories
Works based on the Divine Comedy
American thriller drama films
2020 thriller drama films
American films based on plays
Films based on adaptations